Fidelle is an unincorporated community in Gordon County, in the U.S. state of Georgia.

History
A post office called Fidelle was established in 1889, and remained in operation until being discontinued in 1908. The name is derived from Latin meaning "faithful".

References

Unincorporated communities in Gordon County, Georgia
Unincorporated communities in Georgia (U.S. state)